The Royal Family Order of George IV is an honour that was bestowed as a mark of personal esteem on female members of the British royal family by King George IV. It was the first Royal Family Order issued in the United Kingdom. Prior to George IV's accession in 1820, both ladies and gentlemen of the Court, as well as female members of the royal family, had worn the Sovereign's portrait set in a jewelled frame. George IV formalised the order.

Appearance
King George IV's Royal Family Order was rather ornate in appearance, and the frame that surrounded his portrait was of diamond oak leaves and acorns. The badge was suspended from a white silk bow.

List of known recipients

 The Queen of Württemberg, sister of George IV
 The Duchess of Cambridge, sister-in-law of George IV
 Princess Victoria of Kent, later Queen Victoria, niece of George IV
 Princess Augusta of Cambridge, niece of George IV
 Princess Dorothea Lieven.

See also
 Royal Order of Victoria and Albert
 Royal Family Order of Edward VII
 Royal Family Order of George V
 Royal Family Order of George VI
 Royal Family Order of Elizabeth II

References

Royal family orders
Orders of chivalry of the United Kingdom
George IV of the United Kingdom
British royal family